Bullyard is a small rural town and locality in Bundaberg Region, Queensland, Australia. In , Bullyard had a population of 189 people.

Geography 
It is a small community made up mostly of sugar cane growers, livestock & fruit and vegetable farmers.

Among the fruit and vegetable farms in the Bullyard area are tomato, mango, pineapple and potatoes.

Tagon 
The neighbourhood of Tagon is located in the south of Bullyard; it takes its name from the former Tagon railway station on the now closed Mount Perry railway line. Tagon is an Aboriginal word for a particular species of tree.

History

The town of Bullyard was developed primarily as a cane farming district in the late nineteenth century. The name, however, apparently relates to when a drover named CHARLES HOLMES was transporting bulls between Walla and Tantitha stations and he constructed a temporary yard for the bulls, hence "Bullyard". A railway station, called Kolan Railway Station, was erected in 1881 (on the Bundaberg-Mount Perry railway line, completed in 1884) and timber from the surrounding area was loaded onto trains there. Closer settlement, however, appears to have occurred somewhat later. A provisional school was established in 1901 and becoming a state school in 1909 (and a new school built in 1933), reflecting a small, but growing population at this time. The district was dominated by cane farms supplying the nearby Bingera Sugar Mill.

Bullyard Post Office opened on 1 July 1927 (a receiving office had been open from 1893, known as Kolan until 1897) and closed in 1972.

On 29 November 1992, nearby Bucca was hit by the most violent tornado ever observed in Australia, rated F4 on the Fujita scale. Across the region trees toppled in the unprecedented winds and many residents experienced roofing issues during this time.

In , the locality of Bullyard had a population of 189 people.

Education 
Bullyard has a state school that facilitates the town's primary aged children.  The school was founded in 1921 and currently has an enrolment of 68, at its highest enrolment Bullyard State School held 82 students in 1992. The School's emblem has three parts, a bull, a cane tractor and a book with the motto "Freedom Through Knowledge" .Children are bused in from surrounding towns including Bucca, McIlwraith and Goondoon areas. High school aged children in the Bullyard area usually attend Gin Gin State High School though there are buses into Bundaberg for a range of other secondary and tertiary school facilities.

Across from the state school is the Bullyard Multipurpose Hall. It was used annually for the Bullyard Oktoberfest and various other school and community meetings and presentations.

Bullyard Hall 
Bullyard Hall was built in 1908 by Samuel Kent on 10 acres of land purchased for that purpose. The hall was connected to electricity in 1952 and the hall was extended in 1957 with a bigger dance floor. Other additions included a stage, kitchen and ladies' room. The hall was repainted in the 1960s, with the exterior painted with linseed oil and burnt umber (giving the hall its distinctive appearance).
The hall was, like other local public halls, used for social events such as dances. Movies were shown at the hall from the 1920s and it was also used for church services. Newspaper references from the 1930s through to the 1950s indicate the hall being used as a venue to sign up workers for the local cane crushing season.
The hall grounds were also used for a range of sporting events. There are references to athletics competitions held at Bullyard from 1911 and the track was improved in 1913. A tennis club was formed in 1928 and tennis courts were constructed using crushed ant bed. Cricket was popular, so much so that the Cricket Club merged with the Hall Committee in 1930. Bullyard hosted cricket matches against local teams including Wallaville, Albionville, Gin Gin, Bucca and Bundaberg and the pitch was also constructed from ant bed, similar to the tennis courts.
Bullyard Hall is located in the south-western corner of a 4 hectare reserve that in turn is located in the northern part of town on the eastern side of Bucca Road. A mostly circular fenced sports ground extends from the hall to the north and east. Most of the fenced, predominantly levelled grassed site has been cleared, some remaining scrub vegetation exists in the north and northeast and on the boundaries and it appears that the ring of trees on the perimeter of the sports ground have been deliberately planted.
The hall consists of a low set weatherboard clad timber structure on timber stumps with a slight variation in height to level out the site and features a corrugated iron clad gable roof. An annex with skillion roof is attached on both sides of the main building. The main entrance is from the front via some steps onto a landing covered by a gable roof and double doors.

Bullyard Hall Markets 
Wendi Guy became the new secretary for the hall in 2019 and wanted to find ways to raise money for the hall and make it active again. On 9 June 2019 her first venture began and she introduced a 'Car Boot Sale'. It was so successful that the community asked for it to be run more often so Wendi decided to start up the monthly markets which now run on the first Sunday monthly between 7am and 11am at the grounds. They run a canteen there which brings more money into the hall as well. It's a pet friendly country environment with live music when available.

References

External links 
 Town map of Bullyard, 1983

Towns in Queensland
Bundaberg Region
Localities in Queensland